Nityananda Pradhan (born 18 November 1944) is an Indian politician. He was a member of the 15th Lok Sabha, representing Aska (Lok Sabha constituency).
He left Communist Party of India and joined Biju Janata Dal (BJD) in 2008.
He is a former member of Legislative Assembly of Odisha.

See also
 Indian general election, 2009 (Odisha)

References

1944 births
Living people
Odisha politicians
Biju Janata Dal politicians
Communist Party of India politicians from Odisha
India MPs 2009–2014
Lok Sabha members from Odisha
People from Ganjam district